Katie Sagona (born November 26, 1989) is an American former child actress. She acted in many films and TV shows throughout the 1990s and 2000s, including You've Got Mail, In Dreams, Grumpy Old Men, Grumpier Old Men, Black and White, and she also played Johnny Depp's daughter in Donnie Brasco. She was a Ford Model and appeared in Italian Vogue, and in print for Versace among many others. In 2008, she hosted Barack Obama Round Table on C-SPAN.

Filmography

External links

1989 births
Living people
20th-century American actresses
21st-century American actresses
Actresses from New Jersey
American child actresses
American film actresses
American television actresses
People from Westwood, New Jersey